Kazanka is a rural locality (a village) in Kundashlinsky Selsoviet, Baltachevsky District, Bashkortostan, Russia. The population was 201 as of 2010. There is 1 street.

Geography 
Kazanka is located 91 km southeast of Starobaltachevo (the district's administrative centre) by road. Taykash is the nearest rural locality.

References 

Rural localities in Baltachevsky District